The Cygnus 20 is a Canadian trailerable sailboat that was designed by George Hinterhoeller and first built in 1963.

Production
The design was initially built in 1963 by Hinterhoeller Yachts in Niagara Falls, Ontario, Canada and also by Clarkecraft of St Catharines, Ontario. When Hinterhoeller Yachts was absorbed into C&C Yachts in 1969, the Cygnus 20 tooling was sold to Skene Boats of Gloucester, Ontario. Skene Boats went out of business in 1992 and the design went out of production.

The centreboard boat was originally sold under the name HR 20, but after a class association was formed in 1965-66 the design was renamed the Cygnus 20. It was produced in both centreboard and fixed keel versions from 1965.

Design
The Cygnus 20 is a recreational centreboard boat, or optionally a keelboat, built predominantly of fibreglass, with teak wooden trim above decks and mahogany below decks. It has a fractional sloop rig with aluminum spars, a spooned raked stem, a vertical transom, a transom-hung wooden rudder controlled by a tiller and a centreboard or fixed fin keel. It has a fibreglass buoyancy tank. Normally an open boat, it can be fitted with a detachable cuddy cabin top and was advertised as being able to accommodate four people for overnight sleeping. For stowage it has an aft lazarette.

The boat is normally fitted with a small  outboard motor for docking and manoeuvring.

Variants
Cygnus 20
This centreboard-equipped model displaces .
Cygnus 20 FK
This fixed-keel model displaces  and carries  of cast iron ballast.

See also
List of sailing boat types

References

External links

Keelboats
1960s sailboat type designs
Sailing yachts
Trailer sailers
Sailboat type designs by George Hinterhoeller
Sailboat types built by Hinterhoeller Yachts
Sailboat types built by Skene Boats
Sailboat types built by Clarkecraft